The NMBS/SNCB Class 51 is a class of Co′Co′ diesel locomotive formerly used in Belgium.

Disposition
No class 51s remain in service with NMBS/SNCB although a number have been preserved.
5117 PFT
5120 CFV3V
5128 PFT
5149 PFT
5166 SNCB, Schaarbeek Depot
5183 PFT

Some remained active abroad:
5175 Seen in Sicily July 2017
5132 Spotted in Sicily April 2018

References

External links
 HLD 51

Co′Co′ locomotives
National Railway Company of Belgium locomotives
Diesel-electric locomotives of Belgium
Railway locomotives introduced in 1961
Cockerill locomotives
Standard gauge locomotives of Belgium